Major-General Sir Thomas Munro, 1st Baronet KCB (27 May 17616 July 1827) was a Scottish soldier and British colonial administrator. He served as an East India Company Army officer and statesman, in addition to also being the governor of Madras Presidency.

Background
Munro was born in Glasgow on 27 May 1761 to the Glaswegian merchant Alexander Munro. Thomas' grandfather was a tailor, who prospered by successful investments in American tobacco.  After working as a bank clerk, Alexander Munro joined the family's prosperous tobacco business, but was ruined by the collapse of the tobacco trade during the American Revolutionary War. Thomas was also claimed to be a direct descendant of George Munro, 10th Baron of Foulis (died 1452), chief of the Highland Clan Munro, but clan historian R. W. Munro has contested this claim.

Thomas was educated at the University of Glasgow. While at school, Thomas was distinguished for a singular openness of temper, a mild and generous disposition, with great personal courage and presence of mind. Being naturally of a robust frame of body, he surpassed all his school-fellows in athletic exercises, and was particularly eminent as a boxer. He was at first intended to enter his father's business, but in 1779 was appointed to an infantry cadet ship in Madras.

Military career
He served with his regiment during the hard-fought war against Hyder Ali (1780–1783), under his namesake Major Sir Hector Munro, 8th of Novar. Thomas also later served alongside another namesake John Munro, 9th of Teaninich. Thomas served again with his regiment in the first campaign against Tipu Sultan (1790–1792). He was then chosen as one of four military officers to administer part of the territory captured from Tipu, where he remained for seven years learning the principles of revenue survey and assessment which he afterwards applied throughout the presidency of Madras. After the final downfall of Tipu in 1799, he spent a short time restoring order in Kanara; and then for another seven years (1800–1807) he was placed in charge of the Ceded Districts ceded by the Nizam of Hyderabad, where he introduced the ryotwari system of land revenue. After a long furlough in Britain, during which he gave valuable evidence upon matters connected with the renewal of the East India Company's charter, he returned to Madras in 1814 with special instructions to reform the judicial and police systems.

On the outbreak of the Pindari War in 1817, he was appointed as brigadier-general to command the reserve division formed to reduce the southern territories of the Peshwa. Of his services on this occasion Lord Canning said in the House of Commons:

In 1819 Munro was appointed a Knight Commander of the Order of the Bath (KCB).

Governor of Madras
In 1819, he was appointed governor of Madras, where he founded systems of revenue assessment and general administration which substantially persisted into the twentieth century. He is regarded as the father of the 'Ryotwari system'. His official minutes, published by Sir A. Arbuthnot, form a manual of experience and advice for the modern civilian. Munro was created a baronet in 1825. He died of cholera on 6 July 1827 while on tour in the ceded districts, where his name is preserved by more than one memorial. An equestrian statue of him, by Francis Legatt Chantrey, stands in Madras city.At his behest a Committee of public instruction was formed in 1826, which eventually led to the formation of Presidency College.

Incidents at Mantralayam and Gandi (Andhra Pradesh)

The village of Mantralayam in Andhra Pradesh is where the famous Dvaita saint Raghavendra Swami is located. An anecdote of Sir Thomas Munro is told about this place. When Sir Thomas Munro was the Collector of Bellary in 1800, the Madras Government ordered him to procure the annual tax from the Math and Manthralaya village. When the Revenue officials were unable to comply with this order, Sir Thomas Munro visited the Math for investigation. He removed his hat and shoes and entered the sacred precincts. Sri Raghavendraswamy emerged from the Vrindavan and conversed with him for some time, about the resumption of endowment. The Saint was visible and audible only to Munro, who received Mantraskata (God's blessing). The Collector went back and wrote an order in favour of the Math and the village. This notification was published in the Madras Government Gazette in Chapter XI, page 213, with the caption "Manchali Adoni Taluka". This order is still preserved in Fort St. George and Mantralayam.

Statue

Sculpted by Francis Chantrey, and sitting proud and straight on his horse, in the middle of Chennai's famed Island, is The Stirrupless Majesty. Either due to an oversight, or depicting his affinity for bareback riding, Sir Thomas Munro's statue shows him without saddle and stirrup.

See also
Munro Baronets

Notes

References

Attribution:

Further reading

1761 births
1827 deaths
Baronets in the Baronetage of the United Kingdom
Military personnel from Glasgow
British military personnel of the First Anglo-Burmese War
Knights Commander of the Order of the Bath
Deaths from cholera
Thomas Munro, 1st Baronet of Linderits
Infectious disease deaths in India
British East India Company Army generals
Scottish generals
Scottish knights
Scottish civil servants
British military personnel of the Second Anglo-Mysore War
British military personnel of the Third Anglo-Mysore War
British military personnel of the Third Anglo-Maratha War